Nadim Sadek (born October 1962) Irish-Egyptian marketing-entrepreneur. Sadek became a Director of Burns Sadek Research and founded Sadek Wynberg Research that was sold to WPP as Sadek Wynberg Millward Brown. 

He served as Global CEO of Millward Brown's Qualitative Network, and later as Worldwide Commercial & Strategy Director at Research International. He created the Inish Turk Beg brand, based on the values of the eponymous island, Inish Turk Beg. He sold the island in 2013, while keeping the intellectual property rights to the brand and businesses he established. He was Founder & CEO at brand management consultancy, TransgressiveX, based in London, specialising in developing business value through brands, particularly employing a contemporary iteration of Social Exchange Theory. This relaunched in June 2019 as ProQuo AI.

Career
A career in market research began in 1985 at Lansdowne Market Research in Dublin, before he moved to London. Sadek became a Director of Burns Research Partners, renamed Burns Sadek Research two years later, a boutique qualitative research firm.  After 7 years there, Mr Sadek founded Sadek Wynberg Research in Kensington in 1993.  SWR conducted research for the development of brands and communications for many of the world's blue-chip companies, including Unilever, Bacardi Global Brands, Kimberly-Clark, Vodafone and Sony Ericsson. The firm grew to be the largest of its kind in the UK by 2000 and the world by 2003, whereupon it was sold to WPP, becoming Sadek Wynberg Millward Brown 

Sadek became Global Leader of Millward Brown's Qualitative Network for the next three years before taking up the role of Worldwide Commercial & Strategy Director at Research International, a company operating in 52 countries.

Talking of ‘practising what I preach’ he then 'became a client' and created the Inish Turk Beg brand, based on the values of the eponymous island, Inish Turk Beg, off the coast of Ireland which he had purchased in 2003.

The company that owned Inish Turk Beg went into receivership in 2012 and the island was put up for sale.  Mr Sadek retains all the assets of the island, including the Intellectual Property Rights to the Inish Turk Beg brand.

His principal activity is as Founder & CEO at ProQuo AI, headquartered in London, with offices in Philadelphia, New York and Johannesburg. This brings together breakthrough learning in neuroscience from its human sciences team, application of new technology through its machine sciences team, and the use of a software-as-a-service business model, creating subscription services to manage brands, for £1000 per month. TransgressiveX was appointed globally on Unilever's business in 2015. Further successes with clients such as KCF  and the launch of an innovative quantitative research framework for brands  resulted in TransgressiveX being nominated as one of 2016's top disruptive marketing brands.

In the Media
Mr Sadek's increasing breadth of activity led to him featuring on the launch series of The Secret Millionaire in Ireland, screened by RTÉ (October 2011), and Channel 4, followed up by a ‘Look-back’ episode screened by RTÉ (October 2012), 
 which saw him return to the groups he had benefacted, Cork Institute of Technology's Cork Academy of Music (socially-inclusive music education), Cois Tine (welcome and pastoral care for refugees and asylum seekers),  Rebel Wheelers (competitive sports for disabled children), and Cork Penny Dinners (nourishment without judgment). In 2020, Forbes focused on how ProQuo AI was transforming marketing, especially for Small and Medium-sized Enterprises, through the introduction of Artificial Intelligence, led by Sadek.

Mr Sadek also writes occasional features, such as on the topic of Brexit, general elections and brand management.

Personal life
Sadek was born to an Egyptian father (Fernando Habib Sadek 1928–2005) who worked as an epidemiologist with the World Health Organisation and Irish mother (Marie Celine Meehan from Limerick city, born 1927) who worked as a nurse then teacher. Sadek was educated and lived around the world in Ghana, Nigeria, Kenya, Malaysia, Indonesia, Barbados, Antigua and Ireland. Sadek has an older brother (Anis, b. 1955 - retired Managing Partner of Deloitte) and sister (Elizabeth, b. 1951 - retired teacher in Angers, France). He married Sandra O’Malley (b. 1959) in 1989 and they have four children. They live in London.

References 

1962 births
Living people
Market researchers